Nebria rufescens is a species of ground beetle in the Nebriinae subfamily that can be found everywhere in Europe, except for Benelux, Bosnia and Herzegovina, Denmark, Monaco, San Marino, Vatican City, and various European islands.

References

Beetles described in 1768
Beetles of Europe
Taxa named by Hans Strøm